Lt. Howard Mather Burnham (March 17, 1842 – September 19, 1863), is best known for having fought and died at the Battle of Chickamauga in Georgia, during the American Civil War.

Early life
Burnham attended a military high school in Hamden, Connecticut and upon graduation he attended Sanborn's school in Concord, Massachusetts and Lawrence scientific school (now known as Harvard School of Engineering and Applied Sciences) in Cambridge, Massachusetts.  Soon after the Massachusetts Volunteers were attacked in Baltimore, Maryland, he enlisted in the Springfield City Guards on April 19, 1861.

Military career
Burnham was sent to the 10th Regiment Massachusetts Volunteer Infantry and received a commission as a Second Lieutenant in command of the Fifth Artillery in the regular Union Army.  He served impatiently for several months as a Union Army recruiting officer in Towanda, Philadelphia, New York, and Dubuque until he was ordered to Fort Hamilton in New York on garrison duty.  He went to Washington, DC for an assignment as Aide-de-camp to his uncle Major General Joseph K. Mansfield, commander of the XII Corp of the Army of the Potomac, but before he had the chance to join his staff Gen. Mansfield was killed at the Battle of Antietam. After several months he was promoted to First Lieutenant and joined the 5th U.S. Light Artillery, Battery H of the Army of the Cumberland under General William Rosecrans. Shortly after taking command of Battery H, he had been appointed Chief of Artillery of the 1st division, 14th army corps and placed on the staff of Gen. Absalom Baird.

Battle of Chickamauga
On the morning of September 19, 1863, Burnham was overseeing his artillery battery in the thick woods near Jay's Mill at the Battle of Chickamauga.  With Confederate troops charging his position, he attempted to bring his horses forward to haul off the guns, but alert Confederates shot the animals as soon as they were within sight. With no chance of escape, he ordered his gunners to load their four 12-pound Napoleons with double-shotted canister.  Battery H opened up as soon as the 18th Infantry skirmishers were clear, causing the Confederates to take cover. The 16th Infantrymen in front of the guns occupied a slightly lower elevation and saw the shells flying over their heads.  But Battery H did not have much infantry support and enemy fire quickly shot down their gunners. Burnham was shot in the chest, mortally wounded.  When his second in command, Lt. Joshua A. Fessenden, asked Burnham if he was hurt, he responded: "Not much, but save the guns!".

Lt. Fessenden had the following to say about the battle that day: During the morning, after an all night march, we were ordered forward by General King. The battery was hardly in position before the troops on the right gave way and it was exposed to a most terrific fire of musketry from front and flank. General King ordered us to limber to the rear, but it was impossible to execute the order, since many of the cannoneers were either killed or wounded, and the horses shot at the limbers. At the first fire, Lieut. Burnham fell mortally wounded; Lieut. Ludlow was also wounded and fell into the enemy's hands, and myself slightly wounded in the side. The battery was taken by the enemy, after firing sixteen rounds of canister.

Lt. Fessenden had himself been shot in the hip, but he assumed command.  Battery H was overrun but Lt. Fessenden successfully rallied his troops, recaptured his artillery, and even took one gun of the Confederates. Lt. Fessenden kept the field and brought off the pieces but without their caissons as these had to be abandoned through lack of horses.  While the battle ranged on Burnham survived for another two hours. In addition to Burnham, 42 men in his unit were either killed or wounded and more than one-third of the horses were shot that day.

Gen. John King dispatched the following in his report: I take this occasion to speak in the highest terms of the officers of Battery H, 5th Artillery, 1st Lieut. H. M. Burnham and 2d Lieutenants Israel Ludlow and J. A. Fessenden. The officers of this battery, finding it impossible to retire, remained with their pieces, firing, until they were forcibly taken from them by the enemy.

Family
Burnham was a descendant of Thomas Burnham (1617–1688) of Hartford, Connecticut, the first American ancestor of a large number of Burnhams. The descendants of Thomas Burnham have been noted in every American war, including the French and Indian war.
 
 Roderick Henry Burnham, Esq. (February 27, 1816 – July 18, ?) of Longmeadow, Massachusetts, a member of the Massachusetts Legislature from (1861–1862) and Justice of the Peace, father
 Katharine Livingstone Burnham (May 8, 1822 –?), daughter of Samuel Mather of Connecticut, a descendant of Rev. Richard Mather of Dorchester, Massachusetts
 Emily Livingston Burnham (May 17, 1849 – November 10, 1871), sister.
 Mather Howard Burnham (1870–1917), who became a spy for France in World War I, and Frederick Russell Burnham, the celebrated scout, (1861–1947) were his second cousins.

See also

Notes

Bibliography
 
 

1842 births
1863 deaths
People from Longmeadow, Massachusetts
Union Army officers
United States Army officers
People of Massachusetts in the American Civil War
Union military personnel killed in the American Civil War